Raiffeisen Bank is a universal bank on the Romanian market, providing a complete range of products and services to private individuals, SMEs and large corporations via multiple distribution channels: banking outlets (more than 350 throughout the country), ATM and EPOS networks, phone-banking (Raiffeisen Direct) and mobile-banking (myBanking).

History 
Raiffeisen Bank Romania has resulted from the merger in June 2002 of the two Raiffeisen Group banks present on the local market Raiffeisenbank (Romania) S.A., established in 1998 as a subsidiary of RZB Austria and Banca Agricola Raiffeisen S.A. established in April 2001, after the take over by RZB Austria of the Romanian state-owned Banca Agricola.

After the privatization, Raiffeisen Bank managed a turnaround – at the end of 2004 it posted a net profit of EUR 28.3 million, six times higher than the one registered in 2003 (EUR 4.6 million). Total assets more than doubled as compared to the previous year, reaching more than EUR 2,000 million. In 2005 the bank continued to implement a significant investment plan focused mainly on the infrastructure and IT&C systems, the modernization of the branch network and extension of ATM and POS networks. The bank services more than 2 million customers.

These results were recognized by well-known foreign and Romanian publications. The British magazine Euromoney awarded Raiffeisen Bank the title “Best investment bank in Romania”, while Global Finance nominated Raiffeisen Bank “Best Bank in Romania” for two years in a row, 2004 and 2005.

On March 20, 2013 it took over the retail credit division of CitiBank Romania.

References

External links
 Official Website

Banks of Romania
Raiffeisen Zentralbank
Banks established in 2002
Romanian companies established in 2002